Peter John Veniot,  (October 4, 1863 – July 6, 1936) was a businessman and newspaper owner and a politician in New Brunswick, Canada. He was the first Acadian premier of New Brunswick.

Early life and career
He was born in Richibucto, New Brunswick but later moved to Pictou, Nova Scotia with his family. Veniot worked as a journalist and typographer for the Pictou Standard and then the Moncton Transcript. He then moved to Bathurst, where he became editor and later owner of Le Courrier des Provinces Maritimes.

Political career
Veniot was first elected to the Legislative Assembly of New Brunswick in 1894, but left politics in 1900 for a customs job. In 1912, he was hired to reorganize the Liberal Party of New Brunswick, and became a Member of the Legislative Assembly (MLA) again in 1917.

He served in the cabinet of Premier Walter Foster as Minister of Public Works. As Minister, Veniot was responsible for the creation of the New Brunswick Electric Power Commission and the modernization of the province's highway system.

Veniot became Premier in 1923 following Foster's resignation. He was a supporter of the Maritime Rights Movement or Duncan Commission, which advocated more power for the Maritime provinces in Canadian confederation. His government was defeated in the 1925 provincial election.

Veniot resigned as provincial Liberal leader in 1926 in order to enter federal politics in the 1926 federal election. He served as Postmaster General in the cabinet of William Lyon Mackenzie King. In cabinet, Veniot advocated implementation of the Duncan Commission recommendations on alleviating Maritime alienation. Recommendations of freight-rate reductions and subsidy increases were implemented, but suggestions for subsidies based on fiscal need and transportation use to encourage regional development were ignored.

Death
Veniot remained a Member of Parliament until his death at his home in Bathurst in 1936.

Personal life
Married in 1885 to Catherine Melanson, their son Clarence Joseph was elected in the federal riding of Gloucester by-election after his death. He and his wife are interred in Bathurst, in the cemetery adjacent to the offices of the newspaper that made his fortune.

Electoral record

References

Government of New Brunswick biography (pdf)

Further reading
 Arthur T. Doyle, The Premiers of New Brunswick, Fredericton: Brunswick Press, 1983. pp. vii-xi; 47-50. 
 Arthur T. Doyle, Front Benches and Back Rooms: A story of corruption, muckraking, raw partisanship and political intrigue in New Brunswick, Toronto: Green Tree Publishing, 1976.
 

1863 births
1936 deaths
Acadian people
People from Bathurst, New Brunswick
Canadian newspaper publishers (people)
Journalists from New Brunswick
Liberal Party of Canada MPs
Members of the House of Commons of Canada from New Brunswick
Members of the King's Privy Council for Canada
New Brunswick Liberal Association MLAs
Businesspeople from New Brunswick
People from Kent County, New Brunswick
Premiers of New Brunswick